The Rose Valley is a region in Bulgaria located just south of the Balkan Mountains and the eastern part of the lower Sredna Gora chain to the south. Geologically, it consists of two river valleys, those of the Stryama to the west and the Tundzha to the east.

The Rose Valley of Kazanlak stretches for 10-12 kilometers and is 95 kilometers long with an average height of 350 meters and an area of 1895 square kilometers.

Respectively, the Kalofer Valley of Roses covers an area of 1387 square kilometers with a length of 55 kilometers and 16 kilometers width.

The valley is famous for its rose-growing industry which have been cultivated there for centuries, and which produces close to half (1.7 tonnes) of the world's rose oil. The centre of the rose oil industry is Kazanlak, while other towns of importance include Karlovo, Sopot, Kalofer and Pavel banya. Each year, festivals are held celebrating roses and rose oil.

The picking season lasts from May to June. During this period, the area gives off a pleasant scent and is covered with multi-coloured flowers. The gathering process, traditionally a woman's task, requires great dexterity and patience. The flowers are carefully cut one by one and laid in willow-baskets which are then sent to the distilleries. Tourists are welcome to join the rose-picking process, usually on weekend mornings when special ritual reenactments are organized in villages around Kazanlak.

In September 2014 the European Commission approved Bulgarian rose oil as a new Protected Geographical Indication (PGI).

Honour
Rose Valley Glacier on Livingston Island in the South Shetland Islands, Antarctica, is named after the Rose Valley.

See also
Rosa × damascena

References

External links

Valleys of Bulgaria
Landforms of Plovdiv Province
Landforms of Yambol Province